Lasithi is the easternmost regional unit on the island of Crete, to the east of Heraklion. Its capital is Agios Nikolaos, the other major towns being Ierapetra and Sitia. The mountains include the Dikti in the west and the Thrypti in the east. The Sea of Crete lies to the north and the Libyan Sea to the south.

To the east of the village of Elounda lies the island of Spinalonga, formerly a Venetian fortress and a leper colony. On the foot of Mount Dikti lies the Lasithi Plateau, famous for its windmills. Vai is well known for its datepalm forest.

Thanks to its beaches and its mild climate year-long, Lasithi attracts many tourists. Mass tourism is served by places like Vai, Agios Nikolaos and the island of Chrissi. More off-beat tourism can be found in villages on the south coast like Myrtos, Makrys Gialos or Makrigialos, Xerokambos and Koutsouras.

Lasithi is home to a number of ancient remains. Vasiliki, Fournou Korifi, Pyrgos, Zakros and Gournia are ruins of Minoan date, Lato and Itanos were Doric towns.

History
The history of Lasithi can be traced over at least three millennia. The region has considerable ancient history antecedents, including the Dorian era settlement of Olous and Lato.

Etymology

It has been speculated that ra-su-to, found in Linear B, corresponds to an unattested ancient Lasynthos. There is also a Lyttian tribal name Lasynthioi, presumably reflecting the same name.

Earlier proposals that it is derived from a Venetian 'la' preposed to derivatives of Lyttos (Lyttus > Tselyttus > Tselethe > Xeethe > La Xeethi > Lasithi) or Sitia (Sitia > La Sitia > Lasithi) are unlikely, as the name Lasithi was attested as early as 1211, whereas the Venetians only first arrived in Crete in 1205. Another unlikely etymology derives it from lakkos 'hole or basin' (Lakkos > Lakkidion > Latsidi > Lasidi > Lasithi).

Administration

The regional unit Lasithi is subdivided into four municipalities. These are (number as in the map in the infobox):

Agios Nikolaos (1)
Ierapetra (2)
Oropedio Lasithiou (3)
Siteia (4)

Prefecture

As a part of the 2011 Kallikratis government reform, the regional unit Lasithi was created out of the former prefecture of Lasithi, which was created while Crete was still an autonomous state and was retained after the island joined Greece in 1913. The prefecture had the same territory as the present regional unit, except Viannos area that belonged to Lasithi but was annexed to Heraklion prefecture in 1932. At the same time, the municipalities were reorganised, according to the table below.

Provinces

Before 2006, Lasithi was divided into 4 provinces: 
Province of Mirambelos - Neapolis
Province of Lasithi - Tzermiado
Province of Ierapetra - Ierapetra
Province of Sitia - Sitia

Transport
GR-90/E65, NW, Cen., E, NE
GR-99, Cen., S

See also
Ieropotamos River
2021 Lasithi earthquake

References

External links

Geographical profile of Lasithi

 
Prefectures of Greece
Regional units of Crete